Acacia oncinocarpa is a shrub or tree belonging to the genus Acacia and the subgenus Juliflorae that is endemic to northern Australia.

Description 
The smooth or flaky bark can be grey to brown in colour and it has angular branchlets with reddish brown granules. Like most species of Acacia it has phyllodes rather than true leaves. The phyllodes have three to five prominent longitudinal nerves. It blooms between March and August producing cylindrical flower-spikes in groups of up to five in the axils. The flower-spikes have a length of  that are loosely packed with pale yellow to cream-coloured flowers. Following flowering woody and glabrous seed pods form that have a narrowly oblanceolate to linear shape and are basally narrowed.

Distribution 
It is native to a small area in the Kimberley region of Western Australia and across tropical areas of the top end of the Northern Territory where it is quite common throughout Arnhem Land. It is often situated on coastal sand dunes or cliff area where it is found growing loamy or sandy and often gravelly soils on or around sandstone, granite or laterite as a part of Eucalyptus or Melaleuca woodland or shrubland communities.

See also 
 List of Acacia species

References 

oncinocarpa
Acacias of Western Australia
Plants described in 1842
Taxa named by George Bentham